Pyotr Petrovich Kashchenko ((9 January 1859) in Yeysk – February 19, 1920, in Moscow) was a famous Russian psychiatrist, social and agrarian activist, author of articles on mental health and mental health services.

Biography 
In 1876–1881 he studied at Moscow University, where he was expelled for participating in student revolutionary movement and was expelled from Moscow to Stavropol. In 1885 he graduated from the Faculty of Medicine Kazan Federal University and received his medical degree. In 1889–1904 director of the Psychiatric Hospital of the Nizhny Novgorod Zemstvo. A Head of the Moscow and St. Petersburg psychiatric hospital. In the years 1904–1906 he was the head physician of the Moscow's Alekseyev Psychiatric Hospital.

In 1905 he participated in the revolutionary events in Moscow, helping the wounded during the uprising in Presnya. In 1905–1906 gg. He led the illegal cross-party Red Cross. Organiser and chairman of the Central Statistical Bureau of the first in Russia to account for mental patients. In May 1917 he led the neuro-psychiatric section of the Council of medical colleges, in 1918–1920 he headed the Subdivision neuro-psychiatric care Commissariat RSFSR. He was buried in the Novodevichy Cemetery.
 
Now this hospital is named Nikolay Alekseyev – Mayor of Moscow (1885–1893), the initiator of the construction of hospitals and fundraising organizer for this construction. The word Kashchenko has become a colloquialism for mental asylum.

References

1859 births
1920 deaths
People from Yeysk
Psychiatrists from the Russian Empire
Soviet psychiatrists
Physicians from the Russian Empire
Russian neurologists